Mustang! is the first full-length studio album by Dragon Ash, released on November 21, 1997. Even though chronologically it was already their third commercial release—preceded by two mini-albums (The Day Dragged On and Public Garden) earlier in the year—nevertheless, due to its full-length nature Mustang! is considered as the group's debut album, also marking their first major commercial release into the Japanese music market.

Track listing

References

External links
 
 

Dragon Ash albums
1997 albums
Victor Entertainment albums